Francisco de Vasconcelos da Cunha (c.1590 – c. mid 17th century) was a Portuguese colonial administrator. He was born around 1590, and was governor of Portuguese Cape Verde from 1624 to 1628. He succeeded Manuel Afonso de Guerra, who was also the Bishop of Santiago de Cabo Verde. He was succeeded by João Pereira Corte-Real. In 1634, he became the captain-general of Portuguese Angola, succeeding Manuel Pereira Coutinho. He was succeeded on 18 October 1639 by Pedro César de Meneses.

See also
List of colonial governors of Cape Verde
List of colonial governors of Angola

Notes

1590s births
Year of death unknown
Colonial heads of Cape Verde
Governors of Portuguese Angola
Portuguese colonial governors and administrators